Elachista loriella is a moth of the family Elachistidae that is found in Arizona.

The forewings are narrow. The ground colour is light grey, sparsely powdered with darker tips of scales that vary from light brownish grey to nearly blackish, particularly along the costal and distal margins.

Etymology
The species is named for Mrs. Lori Ortiz to honour her contribution in the kitchen of the Southwestern Research Station in Portal, Arizona.

References

Moths described in 1997
loriella
Endemic fauna of Arizona
Moths of North America